This is a list of official football games played by Iran national football team between 2010 and 2019.

2010
2010 Qatar Friendship Cup

2011 AFC Asian Cup Qualifier

2011 AFC Asian Cup Qualifier

Friendly

Friendly

Friendly

2010 WAFF West Asian Championship – Preliminary Round

2010 WAFF West Asian Championship – Preliminary Round

2010 WAFF West Asian Championship – Semifinal

2010 WAFF West Asian Championship – Final

Friendly

Friendly

2011
Friendly

2011 AFC Asian Cup – Preliminary Round

2011 AFC Asian Cup – Preliminary Round

2011 AFC Asian Cup – Preliminary Round

2011 AFC Asian Cup – Quarterfinal

Friendly

Friendly

2014 FIFA World Cup Qualifier – Second Round

2014 FIFA World Cup Qualifier – Second Round

2014 FIFA World Cup Qualifier – Third Round

2014 FIFA World Cup Qualifier – Third Round

Friendly

2014 FIFA World Cup Qualifier – Third Round

2014 FIFA World Cup Qualifier – Third Round

2014 FIFA World Cup Qualifier – Third Round

2012
Friendly

2014 FIFA World Cup Qualifier – Third Round

Friendly

2014 FIFA World Cup Qualifier – Fourth Round

2014 FIFA World Cup Qualifier – Fourth Round

Friendly

Friendly

2014 FIFA World Cup Qualifier – Fourth Round

2014 FIFA World Cup Qualifier – Fourth Round

Friendly

2014 FIFA World Cup Qualifier – Fourth Round

2012 WAFF West Asian Championship – Preliminary Round

2012 WAFF West Asian Championship – Preliminary Round

2012 WAFF West Asian Championship – Preliminary Round

2013
2015 AFC Asian Cup Qualifier

2015 AFC Asian Cup Qualifier

Friendly

2014 FIFA World Cup Qualifier – Fourth Round

2014 FIFA World Cup Qualifier – Fourth Round

2014 FIFA World Cup Qualifier – Fourth Round

2015 AFC Asian Cup Qualifier

2015 AFC Asian Cup Qualifier

2015 AFC Asian Cup Qualifier

2014
2015 AFC Asian Cup Qualifier

Friendly

Friendly

Friendly

Friendly

Friendly

2014 FIFA World Cup – Preliminary Round

2014 FIFA World Cup – Preliminary Round

2014 FIFA World Cup – Preliminary Round

Friendly

2015
Friendly

2015 AFC Asian Cup – Preliminary Round

2015 AFC Asian Cup – Preliminary Round

2015 AFC Asian Cup – Preliminary Round

2015 AFC Asian Cup – Quarterfinal

Friendly

Friendly

Friendly

2018 FIFA World Cup Qualifier – Second Round

2018 FIFA World Cup Qualifier – Second Round

2018 FIFA World Cup Qualifier – Second Round

''* FIFA awarded Iran a 3–0 win as a result of India fielding the ineligible player Eugeneson Lyngdoh. The match initially ended 3–0 to Iran.

2018 FIFA World Cup Qualifier – Second Round

Friendly

2018 FIFA World Cup Qualifier – Second Round

2018 FIFA World Cup Qualifier – Second Round

2016
2018 FIFA World Cup Qualifier – Second Round

2018 FIFA World Cup Qualifier – Second Round

Friendly

Friendly

2018 FIFA World Cup Qualifier – Third Round

2018 FIFA World Cup Qualifier – Third Round

2018 FIFA World Cup Qualifier – Third Round

2018 FIFA World Cup Qualifier – Third Round

Friendly

2018 FIFA World Cup Qualifier – Third Round

2017
Friendly

2018 FIFA World Cup Qualifier – Third Round

2018 FIFA World Cup Qualifier – Third Round

Friendly

2018 FIFA World Cup Qualifier – Third Round

2018 FIFA World Cup Qualifier – Third Round

2018 FIFA World Cup Qualifier – Third Round

Friendly

Friendly

Friendly

Friendly

2018
Friendly

Friendly

Friendly

Friendly

Friendly

Friendly

2018 FIFA World Cup – Preliminary Round

2018 FIFA World Cup – Preliminary Round

2018 FIFA World Cup – Preliminary Round

Friendly

Friendly

Friendly

Friendly

Friendly

Friendly

2019
2019 AFC Asian Cup – Preliminary Round

2019 AFC Asian Cup – Preliminary Round

2019 AFC Asian Cup – Preliminary Round

2019 AFC Asian Cup – Round of 16

2019 AFC Asian Cup – Quarterfinal

2019 AFC Asian Cup – Semifinal

Friendly

Friendly

2022 FIFA World Cup Qualifier – Second Round

2022 FIFA World Cup Qualifier – Second Round

2022 FIFA World Cup Qualifier – Second Round

2022 FIFA World Cup Qualifier – Second Round

Statistics

Results by year

Managers

Opponents

References

External links
 www.teammelli.com
 www.fifa.com

2010
2010s in Iran
2009–10 in Iranian football
2010–11 in Iranian football
2011–12 in Iranian football
2012–13 in Iranian football
2013–14 in Iranian football
2014–15 in Iranian football
2015–16 in Iranian football
2016–17 in Iranian football
2017–18 in Iranian football
2018–19 in Iranian football
2010s in Iranian sport